IDMEN is the second full-length album by the Polish rock band Indukti. 

The album is a metaphorical tale of the human struggle with destiny, faith, daily life, nature, and self. The album's title is taken from the mermaid's song from the twelfth book of Homer's Odyssey and means "we know" or "we've seen":

ἴδμεν γάρ τοι πάνθ' ὅσ' ἐνὶ Τροίῃ εὐρείῃ
Ἀργεῖοι Τρῶές τε θεῶν ἰότητι μόγησαν,
ἴδμεν δ', ὅσσα γένηται ἐπὶ χθονὶ πουλυβοτείρῃ.

(For we know all the toils that in wide Troy  
the Argives and Trojans endured through the will of the gods,
and we know all things that come to pass upon the fruitful earth.)

The song Tusan Homichi Tuvota, sung and with lyrics by Nils Frykdahl from Sleepytime Gorilla Museum, is based on an old Hopi tale transcribed by Edward A. Kennard and Albert Yava, and published in 1944 by the Education Division of the United States Indian Service.

The album cover depicts a painting by Justyn Parafianowicz.

Track listing

 "Sansara" - 8:12
 "Tusan Homichi Tuvota" (feat. Nils Frykdahl) - 9:03
 "Sunken Bell" - 2:29
 "...and Who's the God Now?!" (feat. M. Taff) - 10:25
 "Indukted" - 6:51
 "Aemaet" - 8:25
 "Nemesis Voices" (feat. M. Luginbuehl) - 6:19
 "Ninth Wave" - 11:32

Personnel
 Maciej Jaśkiewicz – guitar
 Ewa Jabłońska – violin
 Wawrzyniec Dramowicz – drums
 Andrzej Kaczyński – bass
 Piotr Kocimski – guitar/saz

Guest musicians
 Nils Frykdahl – vocal
 Maciej Taff – vocal
 Michael Luginbuehl – vocal
 Marta Maślanka – dulcimer
 Robert Majewski – trumpet

References

2009 albums
Indukti albums